Bentleyville is a village in Cuyahoga County, Ohio, United States. The population was 864 at the 2010 census.

Bentleyville was laid out in 1831 by Adamson Bentley, and named for him.

Geography
Bentleyville is located at  (41.413520, -81.412996).

Government
The current mayor of Bentleyville is Leonard Spremulli.  He has been in office since January 2008.  There are currently six members on village council.  The mayor and council members are elected every four years.

Demographics

2010 census
As of the census of 2010, there were 864 people, 303 households, and 261 families living in the village. The racial makeup of the village was 95.0% White, 0.7% African American, 2.8% Asian, and 1.5% from two or more races. Hispanic or Latino of any race were 0.6% of the population.

There were 303 households, of which 44.6% had children under the age of 18 living with them, 81.2% were married couples living together, 3.3% had a female householder with no husband present, 1.7% had a male householder with no wife present, and 13.9% were non-families. 13.2% of all households were made up of individuals, and 4.6% had someone living alone who was 65 years of age or older. The average household size was 2.85 and the average family size was 3.14.

The median age in the village was 46.2 years. 29.3% of residents were under the age of 18; 5.2% were between the ages of 18 and 24; 13.2% were from 25 to 44; 42.3% were from 45 to 64; and 10.1% were 65 years of age or older. The gender makeup of the village was 49.5% male and 50.5% female.

2000 census
As of the census of 2000, there were 947 people, 297 households, and 263 families living in the village. The population density was 363.3 people per square mile (140.1/km2). There were 306 housing units at an average density of 117.4 per square mile (45.3/km2). The racial makeup of the village was 97.15% White, 0.84% African American, 1.80% Asian, and 0.21% from two or more races. Hispanic or Latino of any race were 0.95% of the population.

There were 297 households, out of which 52.9% had children under the age of 18 living with them, 85.9% were married couples living together, 2.4% had a female householder with no husband present, and 11.4% were non-families. 8.8% of all households were made up of individuals, and 2.4% had someone living alone who was 65 years of age or older. The average household size was 3.19 and the average family size was 3.43.

In the village, the population was spread out, with 36.4% under the age of 18, 3.2% from 18 to 24, 21.5% from 25 to 44, 32.7% from 45 to 64, and 6.1% who were 65 years of age or older. The median age was 41 years. For every 100 females there were 103.7 males. For every 100 females age 18 and over, there were 99.3 males.

The median income for a household in the village was $160,902, and the median income for a family was $183,243. Males had a median income of $100,000 versus $55,313 for females. The per capita income for the village was $72,392. None of the families and 1.0% of the population were living below the poverty line, including no under eighteens and 1.7% of those over 64.

Education
Bentleyville is served by the Chagrin Falls Exempted Village School District.

References

External links
 Village website

Villages in Cuyahoga County, Ohio
Villages in Ohio
Populated places established in 1831
Cleveland metropolitan area